Otterstadt is a municipality in the Rhein-Pfalz-Kreis, in Rhineland-Palatinate, Germany.

The almost 980-year-old village was once a pure agricultural and fishing village. Today the inhabitants work in the neighbouring industrial cities: Mannheim, Ludwigshafen and Speyer.

References

Rhein-Pfalz-Kreis